TGW Logistics Group is a systems integrator of automated warehouse solutions, headquartered in Marchtrenk, Austria. The company designs, manufactures, implements and maintains end-to-end fulfillment solutions - including everything from goods receipt to storage and order picking to shipping. The company name TGW comes from its original German name Transportgeräte Wels.

Corporate information 

TGW Logistics Group is a holding company which has operational subsidiaries:
 TGW Logistics Group, Wels and Marchtrenk, Austria – Holding
 TGW Mechanics GmbH, Wels and Marchtrenk, Austria – Competence center for product development and manufacturing
 TGW Systems Integration GmbH, Wels and Marchtrenk, Austria – Systems integration unit for Middle, East and South Europe as well as competence center for Software and Controls
 TGW Robotics, Stephanskirchen, Germany – Competence center for robotics and automation technology
 TGW Transportgeräte GmbH, Langen, Germany – Sales office Germany
 TGW Software Services GmbH, Teunz, Germany – Competence center for software and controls
 TGW Systems Integration AG, Rotkreuz, Switzerland – Sales office Switzerland
 TGW Poland, Posen, Poland – Sales Office Eastern Europe
 TGW Turkey Sistem Entegrasyonu Ltd.Sti., Istanbul, Turkey – Sales office South and Eastern Europe
 TGW Limited, Market Harborough, UK – Systems integration unit for the United Kingdom, the Benelux and Scandinavia
 TGW Scandinavia, Hobro, Denmark – Sales office Denmark
 TGW Scandinavia AB, Västra Frölunda, Sweden – Sales office Scandinavia
 TGW Benelux, Roosendaal, the Netherlands – Sales office Benelux
 TGW France SAS, Blagnac, France – Sales office France
 TGW Ibérica Sistemas Logísticos S.L., Sant Just Desvern (Barcelona), Spain – Systems integration unit for Spain, Middle and South America
 TGW Italia Srl, Spilamberto (Modena), Italy – Sales office Italy
 TGW Systems Inc., Grand Rapids, Michigan, USA – Systems integration unit for North America
 TGW China Co. Ltd., Shanghai, China – Systems integration unit for Asia and Australia
 TGW Logistics Equipment Production (Changzhou) Co., Ltd., Changzhou, China – Competence center for manufacturing

Among the top 20 materials handling systems suppliers published by Modern Materials Handling in 2020, TGW takes position No. 11.
.

History 

The company was founded in 1969 by Ludwig Szinicz and Heinz König in Wels, Austria. TGW's headquarters are based in Marchtrenk, Austria.

In 1987 the company opened its first subsidiary (TGW Transportgeräte GmbH) in Siegen (Germany). In 2001 TGW Systems Inc. was founded as subsidiary in the United States. 2005 TGW acquired the US material handling equipment supplier Ermanco. 2010 TGW opened offices in France and Sweden. In 2012 the company opened offices in China, Switzerland and Denmark. In 2015 TGW opened another manufacturing site in Changzhou (China) followed by additional offices in Rosendaal (the Netherlands).

In 2014 TGW acquired the material handling software company 'Klug GmbH'. Two years later 'CHM Automatisierungstechnik' became part of TGW - today known as 'TGW Robotics'. The company is specializing in robotics and automation technology.

In 2018 TGW opened its new headquarters 'TGW Evolution Park' in Marchtrenk, Austria. The five-story office building encompasses 248,000 square feet and offers amenities such as a company restaurant, a gym, a multi-functional activity garden and an on-site childcare facility.

In the 2019/20 fiscal year the company generated revenues of 960 million US dollars and employed more than 3,700 people.

References 

Logistics companies of Austria
Wels-Land District
Economy of Upper Austria